A Brazilian auction is a certain set of rules for a reverse auction. The buyer communicates the price she or he is willing to pay for the whole lot in advance. Then, the sellers bid on how many identical units they are willing to provide at that price. Like in English auction, bidding continues until a bid is made that no other bidder is willing to top. Other sources define Brazilian auction as a reverse auction with similarities to Dutch auction. Like in the previous definition, the overall price is constant. But instead of the increasing price as in Dutch auction, the amount of identical items is decreasing.

History

Brazilian auction as a variation of Dutch auction is introduced by Portum AG for Linde plc in the context of selling gas in Brazil.

References

Types of auction